Steven Earl Gaines (September 14, 1949 – October 20, 1977) was an American musician. He is best known as a guitarist and backing vocalist with rock band Lynyrd Skynyrd from 1976 until his death in the October 1977 airplane crash that claimed other band members and crew.  His older sister Cassie Gaines, a backup vocalist with the band, also died in the crash.

Life and career
Gaines was born in Miami, Oklahoma. When he was 15 years old, he saw the Beatles performing live in Kansas City. After being driven home from the concert, he pestered his father to buy him his first guitar. His band, Manalive, recorded at the famous Sun Records Studio in Memphis, Tennessee. In the 1970s, Steve played with bands ILMO Smokehouse from Quincy, Illinois, Detroit with Rusty Day (an offshoot of The Detroit Wheels) and Crawdad (a band that Steve had started around 1974). In 1975, he recorded several songs with Crawdad at Capricorn studios in Macon, Georgia which were released by MCA in 1988 as One in the Sun (when the present day Lynyrd Skynyrd band began touring) and is listed as his only official solo album. Steve has two other albums, which are known to be very rare CDs from Steve's widow Teresa: I Know a Little (a collection of live recordings with Crawdad as well as Manalive) and Okie Special (a collection of live recordings with Crawdad as well as Detroit). Only 100 copies of each of the two CDs have been made.

In December 1975, Steve's older sister, Cassie, became a member of Southern rock band Lynyrd Skynyrd's female backup singers, The Honkettes. The band had been seeking a replacement for Ed King, one of three lead guitarists in its lineup, since his departure in mid-1975. Cassie recommended Steve, and after initial reluctance the band allowed him to join them onstage for a song during a show at Municipal Auditorium in Kansas City, Missouri on May 11, 1976, Jimmie Rodgers' "T-For Texas, (Blue Yodel #1)". Although the band couldn't hear Steve's playing onstage, soundman Kevin Elson was listening through headphones and told them that Steve was outstanding. They jammed with him informally a couple of times more, then invited him into the band just in time for the recording of Skynyrd's live album One More from the Road. The first of three shows recorded for the album was Gaines' third gig with the band. Ed King and Steve Gaines were both born on September 14, 1949.

Gaines' guitar-picking and songwriting skills were a major revelation to the band, as demonstrated on his one studio album, 1977's Street Survivors. Publicly and privately, Ronnie Van Zant marveled at the vocal and instrumental skill of Skynyrd's newest member, claiming that the band would "all be in his shadow one day".  Steve's contributions included his co-lead vocal with Ronnie on the co-written "You Got That Right" (a solid hit single released after the plane crash) and the rousing guitar boogie "I Know a Little" which he had written before he joined Skynyrd.  So confident was Skynyrd's leader of Steve's abilities that the album (and some concerts) featured Steve delivering his self-penned bluesy "Ain't No Good Life" – one of the few songs in the pre-crash Skynyrd catalog to feature a lead vocalist other than Van Zant.

On October 20, 1977, three days after Street Survivors was released (and five dates into the band's most successful ticket sales tour yet), a plane carrying both musicians and crew between shows from Greenville, South Carolina to Baton Rouge, Louisiana, crashed outside of Gillsburg, Mississippi.  The plane landed in a swampy area and crashed into trees, killing Gaines, Van Zant, Cassie Gaines, assistant road manager Dean Kilpatrick, pilot Walter McCreary, and co-pilot William Gray.

Gaines was cremated and his ashes were buried in Orange Park, Florida in 1977, but were relocated to an undisclosed location after vandals broke into his and bandmate Ronnie Van Zant's tombs on June 29, 2000. Their mausoleums remain as memorials for fans to visit. 10 years later, the new location of their interment was accidentally revealed by a Craigslist ad. A family selling two plots they decided not to retain, ran a Craigslist ad and stated the plots were in the Jacksonville Memory Gardens Cemetery in Orange Park, Florida, adjacent to Ronnie Van Zant's tomb.

Gaines is the subject of the 2001 song "Cassie's Brother" by rock band Drive-By Truckers.

Less than two years after the plane crash, Cassie LaRue Gaines, mother of Cassie and Steve, was killed in an automobile accident near the cemetery where her children were buried.  She was buried near them.

Discography
Lynyrd Skynyrd
One More from the Road (1976)
Street Survivors (1977)

Solo
One in the Sun (1988)

References

External links
 
 Official Lynyrd Skynyrd Homepage
 Official Lynyrd Skynyrd History site
 US NTSB Report on Plane Crash

1949 births
1977 deaths
People from Miami, Oklahoma
Accidental deaths in Mississippi
American rock guitarists
American male guitarists
Lead guitarists
Burials in Florida
Lynyrd Skynyrd members
Victims of aviation accidents or incidents in the United States
Victims of aviation accidents or incidents in 1977
Guitarists from Oklahoma
20th-century American musicians
People from Seneca, Missouri
The Detroit Wheels members
20th-century American guitarists
20th-century American male musicians
Musicians killed in aviation accidents or incidents
Blues rock musicians